Elvio Flores (born 7 March 1939) is an Argentine equestrian. He competed in two events at the 1964 Summer Olympics.

References

1939 births
Living people
Argentine male equestrians
Olympic equestrians of Argentina
Equestrians at the 1964 Summer Olympics
Place of birth missing (living people)